Carol L. Brown is the Nicholls-Biondi Chair for Health Equity at Memorial Sloan Kettering Cancer Center and a professor at Weill Cornell Medical College. She is a surgeon known for her work on gynecological cancers.

Education and career 
Brown's father was a surgeon who had a practice in Los Angeles, and this piqued her interest in medicine. Brown's undergraduate degree is from Harvard University. She earned her M.D. from Columbia University Medical School in 1986 and was elected to Alpha Omega Alpha, a medical honor society. She did her residency at the Hospital of the University of Pennsylvania. In 1990 she started her fellowship at Memorial Sloan Kettering and then became faculty in 1994. In 2005, she became the director of the group improving diversity in clinical care, research, and education. She is also a professor at Weill Cornell Medical College. In February 2021, she was the named the Nicholls-Biondi Chair for Health Equity.

Brown was the 2018 president of the Society of Gynecologic Oncology, making her the first black president of the organization.

Brown is known for her work addressing disparities in cancer care in medically under-served groups. She participated in a 2016 round table discussing the Cancer Moonshot with Vice President Joe Biden. Brown joined the board for the Biden Cancer Initiative in 2017 and led the panel at the 2018 Biden Cancer Initiative Inaugural Summit. She has made multiple presentations on TV and in the print media, for example advocating for regular screening for cancer.

Selected publications

Awards and honors 
In 1984, Brown became the first recipient of the Malcolm X Memorial Scholarship from Columbia University’s College of Physicians and Surgeons. In 2017, Brown gave the American Association for Cancer Research's Jane Cooke Wright Memorial Lectureship. Brown was named a notable black executive by Crain's New York Business (2021) and has been noted as a top doctor in multiple publications presented by Castle Connolly Medical.

References

External links 

 , July 24, 2012
 , May 26, 2016, comments by Brown begin at 25:09
 

Harvard University alumni
Columbia University Vagelos College of Physicians and Surgeons alumni
Memorial Sloan Kettering Cancer Center physicians
Weill Medical College of Cornell University faculty
Year of birth missing (living people)
Living people